Virginia Farmer (born October 19, 1975, in San Luis Obispo, California, United States) is an American Samoan swimmer, who specialized in sprint freestyle events. At age thirty-two, Farmer made her official debut for the 2008 Summer Olympics in Beijing, where she competed in the women's 50 m freestyle. She finished third in the fourth heat by twelve hundredths of a second (0.12) behind Swaziland's Senele Dlamini, with a time of 28.82 seconds. Farmer, however, failed to advance into the semi-finals, as she placed sixty-second out of ninety-two swimmers in the overall rankings.

References

External links
 
NBC 2008 Olympics profile

1975 births
Living people
American Samoan female swimmers
American people of Samoan descent
Olympic swimmers of American Samoa
Swimmers at the 2008 Summer Olympics
American Samoan female freestyle swimmers
People from San Luis Obispo, California
21st-century American women